MS Monarch (formerly Monarch of the Seas) was the second of three s owned by Royal Caribbean International. Beginning on April 1, 2013, Monarch was operated by RCCL's Pullmantur Cruises, before being sold for scrap in 2020 following Pullmantur's closure. The ship was built in 1991 at the Chantiers de l'Atlantique shipyards in Saint-Nazaire, France.

At , Monarch was one of the largest cruise ships in the world at time of her completion. She could carry up to 2,744 passengers.

History 

About a third of the ship burned during its completion afloat in 1990, due to an accident involving some welding equipment. At the time, the costs to make repairs was so uneconomical that it was not clear that the ship could be repaired.
After consideration, the ship was placed in dry dock and the damaged bow section was removed. This section was then built and the metal recycled to construct the next ship of the class Majesty of the Seas.

Monarch had an outdoor basketball court, two shuffleboard courts, and a rock climbing wall. There were also two full-sized salt water pools. She was refurbished in May 2003 to add the rock-climbing wall. The fitness center, spa and children's area were also enlarged.  Prior to being retired from the Royal Caribbean International fleet, Monarch of the Seas (as she was then called) sailed to the Bahamas out of Port Canaveral, Florida.

On 1 April 2013, after serving for Royal Caribbean International for 22 years, Monarch was transferred to Spain's Pullmantur Cruises, joining her sister ship . Before sailing for Pullmantur, Monarch underwent another refurbishment to some of her cabins, casino and shops. She began sailing year-round in the Southern Caribbean on 27 April 2013.

According to reports, the interiors of the ships were stripped of "everything of value". Pullmantur Cruises announced that MS Monarch, MS Sovereign and MS Horizon were to be sold to breakers for scrap in Aliağa, Turkey. She was beached on 22 July 2020 and scrapping started on 5 April 2021 with the removal of the pilot's cabinet.

Incidents

Grounding off St. Maarten

After evacuating a sick passenger at Philipsburg, Sint Maarten, the Netherlands Antilles on December 15, 1998, Monarch of the Seas grazed a reef while departing, opening a gash along the starboard hull  in size. The ship started taking on water and began to sink by the head. Three of its watertight compartments were completely flooded and several others partially flooded.

The ship was intentionally grounded on a sandbar to prevent further sinking. All passengers were evacuated by crew members and local tender operators. There were no deaths. There was also severe damage to the ship. A joint investigation by the Norwegian Maritime Investigator and the United States Coast Guard found that the accident was due to "…a myriad of human performance deficiencies." Reports also indicate that navigation out of the port was done visually rather than using of electronic navigation and that the relocation of a vital buoy was not reflected on charts.

The ship was drydocked for repairs for three months at Atlantic Marine's Mobile, Alabama, facilities. One hundred fourteen of the ship's compartments had to be cleaned.

American comedian John Pinette was aboard the ship at the time of the incident, referencing it in his 2005 DVD 'I Say Nay Nay'.

Gas leak
While docked at the Port of Los Angeles in August 2005, maintenance on a sewage pipe caused a small amount of raw sewage and an unknown amount of hydrogen sulfide gas to escape.  Three crew members were killed and 19 others were injured. Reports said that the deaths were almost instantaneous as the crew members were not wearing breathing apparatus at the time.

Captain's death
Thirty-eight-year-old Captain Joern Rene Klausen was found dead in his stateroom aboard Monarch early the morning of January 30, 2006. The ship was returning to Los Angeles from a three-night cruise to Ensenada, Mexico.  According to reports, the death appeared to be of natural causes.

Coronavirus pandemic 

On 14 March 2020, Panama repatriated 1,504 Colombian tourists from the cruise ship Monarch due to coronavirus fears. Since the port of Cartagena, Colombia was closed, the people had to fly from Colón, Panama. As of 14 March, about 300 people were still waiting to buy tickets.

On 17 April 2020, a Honduran crew member died of the virus in a hospital in Panama City. He had been medically evacuated after having trouble breathing, and tested positive at the hospital.

This and the shutdown of Pullmantur is what caused Monarch to be sold for scrap.

References

External links

 Official website with Royal Caribbean
 Video Clip of Monarch of the Seas
 incidents at sea aboard Monarch of the Seas

Ships of Royal Caribbean International
Ships built by Chantiers de l'Atlantique
1990 ships